Ghostery is a free and open-source privacy and security-related browser extension and mobile browser application. Since February 2017, it has been owned by the German company Cliqz International GmbH (formerly owned by Evidon, Inc., which was previously called Ghostery, Inc. and the Better Advertising Project). The code was originally developed by David Cancel and associates.

Ghostery enables its users to detect and control JavaScript "tags" and "trackers" in order to remove JavaScript bugs and beacons that are embedded in many web pages which allow for the collection of a user's browsing habits via HTTP cookies, as well as participating in more sophisticated forms of tracking such as canvas fingerprinting.

As of 2017, Ghostery is available for Mozilla Firefox, Google Chrome, Internet Explorer, Microsoft Edge, Opera, Safari, iOS, Android, and Firefox for Android.

Additionally, Ghostery's privacy team creates profiles of page elements and companies for educational purposes.

Functionality

Blocking
Ghostery blocks HTTP requests and redirects according to their source address in several ways: 
 Blocking third-party tracking scripts that are used by websites to collect data on user behavior for advertising, marketing, site optimization, and security purposes. These scripts, also known as "tags" or "trackers", are the underlying technology that places tracking cookies on consumers' browsers.
 Continuously curating a "script library" that identifies when new tracking scripts are encountered on the Internet and automatically blocking them.
 Creating "Whitelists" of websites where third-party script blocking is disabled and other advanced functionality for users to configure and personalize their experience.
When a tracker is blocked, any cookie that the tracker has placed is not accessible to anyone but the user and thus cannot be read when called upon.

Reporting
Ghostery reports all tracking packages detected, and whether Ghostery has blocked them or not, in a "findings window" accessible from clicking on the Ghostery Icon in the browser. When configured, Ghostery also displays the list of trackers present on the page in a temporary purple overlay box.

History and use
Originally developed by David Cancel, Ghostery was acquired by Evidon (renamed Ghostery, Inc.) in January 2010. Ghostery is among the most popular browser extensions for privacy protection. In 2014, Edward Snowden suggested consumers use Ghostery along with other tools to protect their online privacy.
Ghostery, Inc. made their software source code open for review in 2010, but did not release further versions of the source code after that. On February 22, 2016, the company released the EULA for the Ghostery browser extension, as a proprietary closed-source product.

Cliqz GmbH acquired Ghostery from Evidon Inc. in February 2017. Cliqz is a German company majority-owned by Hubert Burda Media. Ghostery no longer shares data of any kind with Evidon. 

On March 8, 2018, Ghostery shifted back to an open source development model and published their source code on GitHub, saying that this would allow third-party contributions as well as make the software more transparent in its operations. The company said that Evidon's business model "was hard to understand and lent itself to conspiracy theories", and that its new monetization strategy would involve affiliate marketing and the sale of ad analytics data.

In May 2018, in the distribution of an email promoting changes to Ghostery's practices to comply with General Data Protection Regulation (GDPR), hundreds of user email addresses were accidentally leaked by listing them as recipients. Ghostery apologized for the incident, stating that they stopped the distribution of the email when they noticed the error, and reported that this was caused by a new in-house email system that accidentally sent the message as a single email to many recipients, rather than sending it individually to each user.

Criticism

Under its former owner Evidon, Ghostery had an opt-in feature called GhostRank. GhostRank took note of ads encountered and blocked, then sent that information back to advertisers who could then use that data to change their ads to avoid further being blocked; although this feature is meant to incentivize advertisers to create less intrusive ads and thus a better web experience, the data can just as easily be used to create more malicious ads that escape detection.

Not everyone sees Evidon's business model as conflict-free. Jonathan Mayer, a Stanford graduate student and privacy advocate, has said: "Evidon has a financial incentive to encourage the program's adoption and discourage alternatives like Do Not Track and cookie blocking as well as to maintain positive relationships with intrusive advertising companies".

Since July 2018, with version 8.2, Ghostery shows advertisements of its own to users. Burda claims that the advertisements do not send personal data back to their servers and that they do not create a personal profile.

See also

 Ad blocking
 Disconnect Mobile
 DoNotTrackMe
 List of formerly proprietary software
 NoScript
 Online advertising
 Privacy Badger
 uBlock Origin

References

External links
 
Adware
Formerly proprietary software
Free and open-source Android software
Free Firefox WebExtensions
Google Chrome extensions
Internet Explorer add-ons
Internet privacy software
IOS software
Online advertising
Opera Software